Quảng Khê is a rural commune of Đắk Glong District, Đắk Nông Province, Vietnam.

References

Populated places in Đắk Nông province
District capitals in Vietnam